Edmund Butler, 4th Viscount Mountgarret (1595–1679) was the son of Richard Butler, 3rd Viscount Mountgarret. He acceded to his title on the death of his father in 1651 and retained his lands in the north and east of Kilkenny while many others whose families had been involved in the Catholic Confederacy lost theirs. His father had been heavily involved in the rebellion but Edmund received a pardon for all treasons and rebellions from King Charles II and was restored to his estates.

Marriage
He married three times. His first wife was Lady Dorothy Touchet, whom he married around 1630. She is believed to have died in February 1635. Subsequent marriages to Anne Trensham (1635) and Elizabeth Simeon (c.1606-1674) in 1637 followed in quick succession. He died in 1679 at the age of 84.

See also
 Butler dynasty

References

1595 births
Mountgarret, Edmund Butler 4th Viscount
Edmund
Viscounts in the Peerage of Ireland
Recipients of English royal pardons
16th-century Anglo-Irish people
17th-century Anglo-Irish people